Michael R. Sieben (born June 23, 1946) is a Minnesota politician and former member of the Minnesota House of Representatives. 

A member of the Minnesota Democratic–Farmer–Labor Party (DFL), he represented Washington county in District 51B from 1973 until 1983.

Early life and education
Sieben was born on June 23, 1946, and grew up in Hastings, Minnesota. He attended Hastings High School, followed by St. Cloud State University, where he graduated with a B.S. in Social Studies with Honors in 1968. Sieben attended law school at the University of Minnesota, graduating with a J.D. in 1972.

Career & Minnesota Legislature
After law school, Sieben served six years in the United States Army Reserve. He also served on the Minnesota Constitutional Study Commission as a researcher and on the Minnesota Higher Education Facilities Authority.

Sieben was first elected to the House in 1973, and was re-elected in 1975, 1977, 1979 and 1981. During his time in the Legislature, Sieben served on many committees, including: Appropriations (Chair), Commerce and Economic Development, Judiciary, Metropolitan and Urban Affairs and Rules and Legislative Administration.

Sieben was also a practicing attorney, having served as a partner at Sieben Polk, based in Hastings, Minnesota.

Personal life
Sieben and his wife have three children. He was born into a family active in Minnesota politics. He is the father of former State Senator Katie Sieben and the brother of Harry Sieben, who also served in the Minnesota Legislature during the 1970s and early 1980s. A second generation lawyer, Sieben's father, Harry Sieben Sr., served as chief clerk of the U.S. District Court in Minnesota and was active in Minnesota state politics.

Sieben is a Catholic.

External links

 https://www.leg.state.mn.us/archive/LegDB/Articles/all6SessWeeklyProfile.pdf

Living people
1946 births